The Downsize DC Foundation, formerly known as the American Liberty Foundation, is a policy advocacy organization which aims to limit the size of government in the United States through awareness and petitioning.  Though it claims to be non-partisan, it does have strong political ties to the libertarian movement. It was founded by two-time Libertarian presidential candidate Harry Browne, his former campaign staff members Perry Willis and Jim Babka, and former National Chair of the Libertarian Party Steve Dasbach.  It is split into two organizations, the Downsize DC Foundation and DownsizeDC.org, for tax purposes.

The chair of the Downsize DC Foundation is Jim Babka. Gary Nolan (Chair) and Rick Wiggins also serve on the Board of Directors.

DownsizeDC.org focuses both on preventing what it considers "bad" legislation – generally, legislation that grows government – from passing through Congress and on pushing for legislation that would reduce the size of or constrain the growth of government.

References

External links
 DownsizeDC.org
 Organizational Profile – National Center for Charitable Statistics (Urban Institute)

 

Libertarian organizations based in the United States
Political advocacy groups in the United States
Year of establishment missing